1998–99 Pirveli Liga was the 10th season of the Georgian Pirveli Liga. The 1998–99 season saw 54 teams in competition: 29 teams in the Eastern Zone, and 26 teams in the Western Zone. Pirveli Liga is the second division of Georgian football. It consists of both reserve and professional teams.

League standings
Regionuli Liga (East, A zone)

Regionuli Liga (East, B zone)

Regionuli Liga (West, A Zone)

Regionuli Liga (West, B Zone)

See also
1998–99 Umaglesi Liga
1998–99 Georgian Cup

Erovnuli Liga 2 seasons
2
Georgia